Dalian Shipbuilding Industry Company (DSIC), located in Dalian, Liaoning province, China.  It is part of China Shipbuilding Industry Corporation (CSIC), which has since been merged into China State Shipbuilding Corporation to form China's largest shipbuilding company.

General
Dalian Shipbuilding Industry Company (DSIC) was formed in December 2005, as the result of a merger between Dalian Shipbuilding Industry Company and Dalian New Shipbuilding Industry Company, and is the largest shipbuilding company in China.  It is owned by:
  China Shipbuilding Industry Corporation
which is one of the two state-owned enterprises that came into being under the directive of the China State Council of 1999, the other being:
 China State Shipbuilding Corporation
While the former corporation is listed on the Shanghai Stock Exchange, the latter is not (yet) listed.  Separately, the People's Liberation Army Navy owns military ship yards, such as in Lushun, Dalian, Liaoning.

DSIC  located on two shipyards with a total of 3,400,000 square meters of land and owns 15,000 employees. Its revenue in 2006 exceeded CN￥10,000,000,000 which puts itself as the No. 1 shipbuilding company in China, exceeding Shanghai Waigaoqiao Shipbuilding Industry Company.

History
Dalian Shipbuilding Industry Company has a history of more than 100 years.
 June, 1898: Russia started construction of a ship yard next to Dalian Port, in their new leased territory
 1905: Japan replaced Russia to lease Dalian and continued to expand the ship yard
 1945: Russia liberated Northeast China and shared the operations of Dalian Shipyard with China
 1955: Became "China Shipbuilding Company", managed by China 
 During the 1960s, built China's first submarine equipped with guided missiles
During the 1970s, built China's first destroyer equipped with guided missiles
 July, 1984: Spun off Dalian Maritime Diesel Company (DMDC) and other subsidiaries
 August, 1990: Dalian New Shipyard was completed in the west of the old ship yard
During the 1990s, with help from Hitachi Shipbuilding Corporation (now part of Universal Shipbuilding Corporation) and others, introduced the "block construction" method, reducing the ship building time and cost
 August, 2000: Dalian New Ship Yard was incorporated as Dalian New Shipbuilding Industry Co., Ltd.
 April, 2002: Dalian New Ship Yard was incorporated as Dalian Shipbuilding Industry Co., Ltd.
 2005: Under the directive of the China State Council, these two companies merged to become Dalian Shipbuilding Industry Co., Ltd.
 2009: The former Soviet aircraft carrier Varyag was converted to the People's Liberation Army Navy's aircraft carrier Liaoning for training.
 2014: Converted the Chinese aircraft carrier Liaoning from training aircraft carrier to  active combat ready aircraft carrier
 2013-2017:  Built first indigenous Chinese aircraft carrier Shandong

See also
Shipbuilding and Shipyard
List of shipbuilders and shipyards
 China Shipbuilding Industry Corporation (CSIC)

References

External links
 Official web site 
 China Shipbuilding Industry Corporation web site 

Manufacturing companies based in Dalian
Manufacturing companies established in 1898
Shipyards of China
Chinese companies established in 1898
Shipbuilding companies of China
1898 establishments in the Russian Empire